Libre was a  of the French Navy. She was commissioned in 1800 and remained in active service until the Royal Navy captured her in 1805.

Career 
Libre was built at Le Havre, launched in 1796, and commissioned there on 24 December 1800 under Commander Bourdet. She sailed from Le Havre in March 1801 in the company of  towards Cherbourg, then Cadiz and A Coruña, before cruising to Saint-Domingue and into the North Sea.

From September to December 1803 she was stationed at the mouth of the River Meuse.

Libre suffered two killed and 18 wounded, including her captain, Commander Deschorches. Loire had no casualties but Egyptienne had eight men wounded, one mortally.

By British report, Libre was armed with twenty-four 18-pounders (which had replaced her originally-planned 24-pounders), six 36-pounder obusiers and ten 9-pounder guns. Libre was badly damaged and lost her masts soon after she struck. Loire then took her in tow and reached Plymouth with her on 4 January 1806. The British did not take Libre into Royal Navy service.

Notes

Citations

References
 
 

Age of Sail frigates of France
Romaine-class frigates
1796 ships
Ships built in France